WISE may refer to:

Arts, entertainment, and media
WISE (AM), a radio station licensed to Asheville, North Carolina
WISE-FM, a radio station licensed to Wise, Virginia
WISE-TV, a television station licensed to Fort Wayne, Indiana

Education
Web-based Inquiry Science Environment, a program hosted by Berkeley University
Wilberforce Institute for the study of Slavery and Emancipation, a research institute at University of Hull, England
Wind Science and Engineering Research Center (WiSE), at Texas Tech University
World Islamic Sciences and Education University, in Amman, Jordan

Organisations and programmes
WISE Campaign, an initiative to encourage women into science and engineering
Work improvement in small enterprises, a programme for improvement of occupational health-and-safety conditions
World Information Service on Energy, an international anti-nuclear network based in Amsterdam
World Innovation Summit for Education, a global forum based in Doha, Qatar
World Institute of Scientology Enterprises, a Church of Scientology organization

Technology
Wide-field Infrared Survey Explorer, a NASA-funded infrared-wavelength astronomical space telescope
Wing-in-surface-effect, a type of ground effect vehicle
Windows Interface Source Environment, a 1994 method for Microsoft Windows applications on other hosts 
WISE Installation System, Windows installation authoring software

See also
Wise (disambiguation)